Indovina is a surname. Notable people with the surname include:

Franco Indovina (1932–1972), Italian film director and screenwriter
Lorenza Indovina (born 1966), Italian actress

Italian-language surnames